Piper distigmatum is a species of plant in the family Piperaceae. It is endemic to Panama.

References

Flora of Panama
distigmatum
Data deficient plants
Taxonomy articles created by Polbot